Peristedion cataphractum, the African armoured gurnard, the mailed gurnard or armed gurnard, is a species of marine ray-finned fish belonging to the family Peristediidae, the armoured gurnards or armored sea robins. It is found in the eastern Atlantic Ocean and the Mediterranean Sea.

Taxonomy
Peristedion cataphractum was first formally described as Trigla cataphracta in 1758 by Carl Linnaeus in the 10th edition of his Systema Naturae with its type locality given as the Mediterranean Sea of southern France. In 1801 the French naturalist Bernard Germain de Lacépède described a new species and genus when he described Peristedion marmalat, from the Mediterranean Sea and the Moluccas. In 1826 Jean Baptiste Bory de Saint-Vincent designated P. marmalat as the type species of the genus . P. marmalat is now treated as a junior synonym of Linnaeus's Trigla cataphracta. The specific name cataphractum means “armoured”, an allusion to the bony plates forming a cuirass on this fish’s body.

Description
Peristedion cataphractum has a lerge, bony head which has numerous spines and ridges and a wide snout with two short and wide , or long and thin, rostral extensions projecting from the suborbital or preorbital bones. The mouth is inferior and there are barbels on the lower jaw and the chin with two of these being long and branched. There are no teeth in the jaws or on the roof of the mouth and there is no tongue. The first and second dorsal fins are set closely together, the first has 7 or 8 spines while the second contains 18 or 19 soft rays, The anal fin has between 27 and 30 rays and the  pectoral fins have the 2 lowermost rays separated from the others. The body is elongate and has an octagonal section. The body is armoured with 4 rows of spiny, bony plates, called scutes. on each side with each row having between 17 and 21 scutes. The overall colour is dark pink or red, paler on the lower body. The maximum published total length for this species is  although  is more typical.

Distribution and habitat
Peristedion cataphractum is found in the eastern Atlantic from the British Isles, although it is rare north of the Bay of Biscay, south to Angola and throughout the Mediterranean Sea. It is a demersal fish found on muddy or rock bottoms on the continental shelf.

Biology
Peristedion cataphractum uses its rostrum to dig in the mud, as it searches for prey. It may stand or walk on the substrate using its two free pectoral rays for locomotion. Following a pelagic larval phase the juveniles settle in coastal waters before migrating to deeper water as adults. These fish are gregerious.  They feed on small benthic invertebrates, mostly gastropods and other molluscs, also crustaceans.

Fisheries
Peristedion cataphractum is a bycatch of semi industrial and artisanal fisheries with bottom trawl nets in the Mediterranean, here it is usually discarded. Despite this the species is regularly recorded in Spanish fish markets, as well as those of the Tyrrhenian Sea and Sicily where it may be sold fresh or chilled. It tends not to be used in Africa and although it is locally abundant in Morocco it is not eaten there.

References

cataphractum
Fish described in 1758
Taxa named by Carl Linnaeus